Friedrich Calker (July 4, 1790 – January 5, 1870), German philosopher, was educated in Jena.  For a short time, he was a lecturer in Berlin. In 1818, he was called to an extraordinary professorship in the newly founded University of Bonn, becoming an ordinary professor in 1826. He substantially echoed the ideas of his teacher Jakob Fries. His two major works are Urgesetzlehre des Wahren, Guten und Schönen (The Original Teachings on the Law of the True, Good and Beautiful; Berlin 1820) und Denklehre (Logic; Bonn 1822).

References 
Heinrich von Eggeling, “Calker, Friedrich” in Allgemeine Deutsche Biographie, Band 3 (Leipzig, 1876), S. 706-707. 
Carl Schurz, Reminiscences (3 volumes), New York: The McClure Company, 1907.  Schurz writes of Calker (although he refers to him as “van Calker” rather than simply “Calker”) in Chapter V where Calker's residence is the target of a students' march to deliver a petition, Calker being the rector of the University at that point.  The petition proposed the abolishing of the office of “government authority,” (Regierungsbevollmächtigter ) then held by August von Bethmann-Hollweg.  Schurz seemed amused by the timid man who gave a speech regarding the “soaring spirit of German youth.” In the German edition, Schurz remarks that he seemed to find the soaring spirit rather spooky.

19th-century German philosophers
Academic staff of the University of Bonn
1790 births
1870 deaths
People of the Revolutions of 1848
German male writers